Haimbachia proalbivenalis is a moth in the family Crambidae. It was described by Stanisław Błeszyński in 1961. It is found in Nigeria, the Gambia and India.

References

Haimbachiini
Moths described in 1961